Thailand competed at the 2022 World Aquatics Championships in Budapest, Hungary from 18 June to 3 July.

Artistic swimming 

Thailand entered 12 artistic swimmers.

Women

Mixed

Diving 

Thailand entered 1 diver.

Men

Open water swimming

Thailand entered 4 open water swimmers (2 male and 2 female )

Men

Women

Swimming 

Thailand entered 9 swimmers.
 Men

 Women

 Mixed

Water polo 

Summary

Women's tournament

Team roster

Group play

13–16th place semifinals

15th place game

References 

Nations at the 2022 World Aquatics Championships
World Aquatics Championships
2022